Katie is an English feminine name. It is a form Katherine, Kate, Caitlin, Kathleen, Katey and their related forms. It is frequently used on its own.

People

Sports
Katie Boulter (born 1996), British tennis player
Katie Clark (born 1994), British synchronized swimmer
Katie Hill (born 1984), Australian wheelchair basketball player
Katie Hnida (born 1981), American NCAA football player
Katie Hoff (born 1989), American Olympic swimmer
Katie Ledecky (born 1997), American swimmer
Katie Levick (born 1991), English cricketer
Katie Sowers (born 1986), American football coach
Katie Swan (born 1999), British tennis player
Katie Taylor, Irish boxer and footballer, five-time world boxing and 2012 Olympic champion
Katie Thorlakson (born 1985), Canadian soccer player

Television and film
 Katie Brown (TV personality) (born 1963), American television show host
 Katie Couric (born 1957), American journalist
 Katie Cassidy (born 1986), American singer and actress
 Katie Featherston (born 1982), American actress, known for the 2007 horror film "Paranormal Activity"
 Katie Finneran (born 1971), American actress
 Katie Griffin (born 1973), Canadian actress, voice actress, and singer
 Katie Holmes (born 1978), American television and film actress
 Katie Hopkins (born 1975), contestant on The Apprentice (UK) Series 3 and far-right political figure.
 Katie Leclerc (born 1986), American actress
 Katie Leung (born 1987), Scottish actress
 Katie Lucas (born 1988), American actress and writer
 Katie McGrath (born c.  1983), Irish actress and model
 Katie Piper (born 1983), British broadcaster and model, wounded in a 2008 acid attack
 Katie Tallo, Canadian filmmaker, screenwriter, and novelist

Music
 Katie Gregson-MacLeod (born 2000/2001), Scottish musician
 Katie Kim (born 1993), South Korean-born American singer
 Katie Kissoon (born 1951, Trinidad and Tobago), English singer
 Katie Melua (born 1984), Georgian-born British singer-songwriter
 Katie Underwood (born 1975), Australian singer-songwriter
 Katie Waissel (born 1986), British singer and contestant in the seventh series of The X Factor (UK)
 Katie White (born 1983), English singer and front-woman of The Ting Tings

Other
 Katie Bouman (born 1989/90), American computer imaging scientist, led the team that captured the first image of a black hole.
 Katie Hafner (born 1957), American journalist
 Katie Heaney (born 1986), American writer
 Katie Hillier (born 1973/74), British fashion designer
 Katie Mack (born 1981), American astrophysicist
 Katie Mitchell (born 1964), English theatre director
 Katie Perry (born 1980), Australian designer
 Katie Price (born 1978), British model also known as "Jordan"
Katie Rough (2009-2017), English girl killed by a 15-year-old female

Fictional characters
 Katie Bell, in the Harry Potter series by J.K. Rowling
 Katie Fitch, in the British teen drama Skins
 Katie Forester, a character from the Yo-kai Watch franchise (originally named Fumika Kodama)
 Katie Gardner, in the Percy Jackson series by Rick Riordan
 Katie (Pidge Gunderson) Holt, in the Netflix animated television series Voltron: Legendary Defender
 Katie the Kitten Fairy, from the Rainbow Magic book series
 Katie Knight, in the American musical sitcom television series Big Time Rush
 Katie Logan, a character in The Bold and the Beautiful
 Katie Matlin, in the Canadian television drama Degrassi
 Katie Mitchell, in the 2021 3D computer-animated sci-fi comedy film The Mitchells vs. the Machines
 Katie Peretti, in the CBS soap opera As the World Turns
 Katie Sugden, in the ITV soap opera Emmerdale
 Katie Walker, the Yellow Time Force Ranger in the children's action television series Power Rangers: Time Force
 Katie, from the Teletoon animated series Total Drama
 Katie, from the 2003 film School of Rock
 Katie, from the Nick Jr. animated preschool television series PAW Patrol
 Katie, a Fireside Girl from the Disney animated television series Phineas and Ferb
 Katie, a yellow fluff from Horton Hears a Who
 Katie, a tomboyish Wild Kratts Girl from the series Wild Kratts
 Katie, a minor character from the 2004 series 6teen

Other
 Katie (monkey), who played Marcel in the American sitcom Friends
 Katie, the Los Angeles Angels of Anaheim Rally Monkey

See also
Katey
Katy (disambiguation)

References

English feminine given names
Hypocorisms

hu:Kati